The 2015 European Shooting Championships was held in Maribor, Slovenia from July 19 to 31, 2015.

Men's events

300 m rifle

Rifle

Pistol

Running target

Shotgun

Women's events

300 m rifle

Rifle

Pistol

Shotgun

Medal table

References

External links
 Info at the web cite of ESC
 Info at the web cite of ISSF
 Official results
 Result Book

European Shooting Championships
European Shooting Championships
2015 European Shooting Championships
European Shooting Championships
Sport in Maribor
Shooting competitions in Slovenia
European Shooting Championships